While the City Sleeps, is a 1950 Swedish crime drama film directed by Lars-Eric Kjellgren and starring Sven-Eric Gamble, Inga Landgré and Adolf Jahr. It is based on the novel Ligister by Per Anders Fogelström whom also wrote the screenplay. Director Ingmar Bergman provided some input on the film. It was shot at the Råsunda Studios in Stockholm. The film's sets were designed by the art director Nils Svenwall.

Plot summary

Cast
 Sven-Eric Gamble as Jompa
 Inga Landgré as Iris Lindström
 Adolf Jahr as Iris' father
 Elof Ahrle as Manager at Lind Bilservice
 John Elfström as Jompa's father
 Hilding Gavle as Fencer
 Carl Ström as Hansson, janitor
 Ulf Palme as Kalle Lund
 Barbro Hiort af Ornäs as Rutan
 Märta Dorff as Iris' mother
 Ilse-Nore Tromm as Jompa's mother
 Ulla Smidje as Asta
 Hans Sundberg as Knatten Gustafsson
 Arne Ragneborn as Richard 'Sune' Sundberg
 Lennart Lundh as Gunnar 'Slampen' Lindström
 Hans Dahlberg as 	Sven-Erik 'Lång-Sam' Samuelsson
 Åke Hylén as 	Per 'Pekå' Knutsson
 Rolf Bergström as 	Gunnar
 Arthur Fischer as 	Police Officer
 Ebba Flygare as 	The Fence's Wife
 Gunnar Hellström as Young Man in Restaurant
 Julius Jacobsen as Restaurant Pianist
 Henrik Schildt as 	Worker at Lind Bilservice
 Alf Östlund as Andersson
 Harriet Andersson as	Young Girl 
 Mona Geijer-Falkner as Hostess
 Börje Mellvig as Prosecutor 
 Olav Riégo as 	Judge 
 Meta Velander as Cafe Waitress

References

External links
 
 
 

1950 films
1950 drama films
Films based on Swedish novels
Films with screenplays by Ingmar Bergman
1950s Swedish-language films
Swedish black-and-white films
Films directed by Lars-Eric Kjellgren
Swedish drama films
1950s Swedish films